Skácel (feminine Skácelová) is a Czech surname. Notable people with the surname include:

 Jan Skácel (1922–1989), Czech poet
 Jindřich Skácel (born 1979), Czech footballer
 Rudi Skácel (born 1979), Czech footballer

See also
 

Czech-language surnames